Michie Stadium  is an outdoor football stadium on the campus of the U.S. Military Academy in West Point, New York. The home field for the Army Black Knights, it opened  in 1924 and has a current seating capacity of 38,000.

The stadium sits at the upper portion of campus, directly west of Lusk Reservoir. Due to the view offered by its location overlooking the Hudson River and the Neo-Gothic architecture of the campus below, it was rated as Sports Illustrateds #3 sports venue of the 20th century.

Overview

Dennis Michie

Michie Stadium is dedicated to the memory of Dennis Michie (1870–1898), who was instrumental in starting the football program while a cadet at the Academy. A member of the Class of 1892, Michie organized, managed, and coached the first football team at West Point in 1890. Six years after graduation, he was killed in Cuba during the Spanish–American War. There have been several renovations since the stadium's first game in October 1924, when Army defeated Saint Louis, 17–0.

Blaik Field
In 1999, the football field at Michie Stadium was named "Blaik Field" on September 25, in honor of Earl "Red" Blaik, West Point's all-time leader in wins during a 17-year tenure from 1941 to 1958. Blaik led Army to three consecutive national titles from 1944 to 1946.

Playing surface
Since 2008, the playing surface has been FieldTurf.  This replaced AstroPlay, which had been used since 2001.  The stadium's playing field was natural grass until AstroTurf was installed in 1977.

Army–Navy Game
Michie Stadium first hosted the Army–Navy Game in 1943 during World War II, after it was played at Thompson Stadium at Annapolis the year before. Neither Army nor Navy had played at an on-campus facility since very early in the rivalry, since teams' home stadiums are not nearly large enough to accommodate the crowds and media that usually attend the rivalry games. Their rivalry game is normally played at a neutral site between the campuses on the East Coast, usually in Philadelphia in early December. In 2020, the Army–Navy Game was moved from Philadelphia to Michie Stadium due to state-imposed attendance limits on outdoor events as a result of the COVID-19 pandemic.

Attendance Records

Gallery

See also
 List of NCAA Division I FBS football stadiums

References

External links

 
 World Stadiums.com - photos - Michie Stadium

Army Black Knights football
Army Black Knights men's lacrosse
College football venues
College lacrosse venues in the United States
American football venues in New York (state)
Lacrosse venues in New York (state)
Sports venues in Orange County, New York
Sports venues completed in 1924
1924 establishments in New York (state)